The Joystrings (originally credited as The Joy Strings) were a 1960s UK Christian music group led by classically trained keyboard player and singer Joy Webb, an officer (now retired) in the Salvation Army.

History
After appearing on Cliff Michelmore's BBC Tonight television show, they were given a recording contract by EMI Records.  In 1964, they became the first Salvation Army pop group to achieve chart success with "It's An Open Secret" and "On A Starry Night". The main members through the years were Joy Webb (who wrote the group's first hit), Peter and Sylvia Dalziel, Bill Davidson, and Wycliffe Noble. The group had a number of other singers drawn, at intervals, from cadets at the William Booth Memorial Training College, Denmark Hill in London.

They also recorded a version of "O Little Town of Bethlehem," using the music of The Animals' "The House of the Rising Sun" - an unusual blending.

In September 2013, 50 years after the Joystrings' formation, group member Sylvia Dalziel wrote about the group in a book published by Shield Books. The book included an introduction by General John Larsson, a tribute from Sir Cliff Richard, a full discography and many photographs never previously published.

Discography

Singles
"It's An Open Secret" (1964) – UK Number 32 (Regal Zonophone: RZ501)
"Million Songs" (1964)
"A Starry Night" (1964) – UK Number 34
"All Alone" (1965)
"The Only One" (1965)
"No Time To Lose"/"Love That's All Around" (Epic Records (USA): 5-10195)
"Christmas Can Be Every Day For You" (1966)

EPs
 The Joy Strings (1964)
 Have Faith in God (1965)
 Christmas with The Joy Strings (1965)
 Joy Strings abroad (1966)
 The song break (1967)

Albums
Well Seasoned (1966)  Regal Zonophone, LRZ4016 mono; SLRZ4016 stereo, UK
Well Seasoned (1966) EPIC Records, US
Carols Around The World (1967)
Joystrings Restrung (2011)
Joystrings Christmas Collection (2012)

Bibliography

References

External links
 Rhythm Finds Its Groove: History of the Joystrings
Joystrings tribute site
Page at Cross Rhythms
"The Joystrings" at 1960s Christian Music
Pathé News report of the Joystrings performing "It's an Open Secret"

English pop music groups
English Christian musical groups
English Salvationists
Musical groups established in the 1960s